Robert George Milne (1 October 1870 – 2 November 1932) was a footballer who played for  the Gordon Highlanders, Linfield and Ireland during the 1890s and early 1900s. Born in Scotland, Milne was stationed in Ireland with the Gordon Highlanders and played seven games for the regimental football team as they won the Irish Cup in 1890. He subsequently signed for Linfield and played 43 games and scored 19 goals for the club in the same competition and winning a total of 39 honours over 20 years.

Between 1894 and 1906, Milne made 27 appearances and scored two goals for Ireland. On 3 March 1894, at the Solitude Ground in Belfast, Milne, together with Olphert Stanfield, was a member of the Irish team that finally avoided defeat to England after thirteen attempts. Against an England side that included Fred Spiksley and Jack Reynolds, Ireland came back from 2–0 down to gain a 2–2 draw. Milne was also captain of Ireland during the 1903 British Home Championship. Until then the competition had been monopolised by  England and Scotland but in 1903, before goal difference was applied, Ireland forced a three-way share. With a team that also included Archie Goodall, Jack Kirwan, Billy Scott and Billy McCracken, Ireland beat both Wales and Scotland 2–0. This was also the first time Ireland had beaten Scotland.

Honours
Gordon Highlanders
Irish Cup Winners: 1890

Linfield
Irish League Winners: 1890–91, 1891–92, 1892–93, 1894–95, 1897–98, 1901–02, 1903–04, 1906–07, 1907–08, 1908–09
Runners Up: 1893–94, 1898–99, 1899–1900, 1902–03
Irish Cup Winners: 1891, 1892, 1893, 1895, 1898, 1899, 1902, 1904
Runners Up: 1894
City Cup Winners: 1895, 1896, 1898, 1900, 1901, 1902, 1903, 1904, 1908
Runners Up: 1899
County Antrim Shield Winners: 1899, 1904, 1906, 1907
Runners Up: 1896, 1897, 1898, 1903, 1905
Belfast Charity Cup Winners: 1891, 1892, 1893, 1895, 1899, 1901, 1903, 1905
Runners Up: 1890, 1900, 1902, 1907, 1908

Ireland
British Home Championship: 1903 (shared)

References

External links
  Irish Cup appearances
  Irish Cup goals

Pre-1950 IFA international footballers
Linfield F.C. players
1870 births
1932 deaths
Association football forwards
Footballers from Angus, Scotland
Irish association footballers (before 1923)
Gordon Highlanders soldiers
Irish League representative players
Scottish footballers
Scottish soldiers
NIFL Premiership players
19th-century British Army personnel